Buckingham Lake, commonly referred to as Buckingham Pond or Rafts Pond, is a body of water located in a residential area of Albany, New York. The lake is adjacent to Buckingham Lake Park, a small recreation area with picnic tables and playground equipment. Three fountains help aerate water during the warmer months, while ice-skating often takes place on the lake's frozen surface during the winter. Wildlife at the lake includes ducks, Canada geese and red-winged blackbirds. The lake is surrounded by a gravel path that is a few feet wide. Streets that border the lake include Berkshire Boulevard, Euclid Avenue, Lenox Avenue, and Colonial Avenue.

External links

Buckingham Pond Conservancy

Geography of Albany, New York
Lakes of New York (state)
Lakes of Albany County, New York